Danai Sriwatcharamethakul (born 5 October 1970) also known as Coach Duan is a Thai volleyball coach. He is the coach of the Thailand women's national volleyball team.

Career

As a volleyball player
 The best athlete Male volleyball College Sports Physical Education

As a coach

Royal decorations 
 2013 -  Commander (Third Class) of The Most Exalted Order of the White Elephant

References

1970 births
Living people
Danai Sriwatcharamethakul
Place of birth missing (living people)
Danai Sriwatcharamethakul